Francesc Homs may refer to:
 Francesc Homs Ferret (born 1951), Catalan politician
 Francesc Homs Molist (born 1969), Catalan politician